Angela Bruce (born 6 May 1951) is an English actress, noted for her television work. Bruce was born in Leeds, West Riding of Yorkshire to a West Indian father and white mother, but was put up for adoption aged three, and brought up in Craghead, County Durham.

Bruce made her screen debut in the 1973 film Man at the Top, and on the London stage she was the second actress to play Magenta in the original production of The Rocky Horror Show, succeeding Patricia Quinn. Regular or recurring roles in television series include Sandra Ling in Angels (1975–83), Janice Stubbs in Coronation Street (1978) and reporter Chrissie Stuart in Press Gang (1989–90). In 1980, she appeared in "Charlie Boy", an episode of Hammer House of Horror.

Bruce is also recognisable to sci-fi fans for her performance as Brigadier Winifred Bambera in the 1989 Doctor Who serial Battlefield, as well as her portrayal of Dayna Mellanby in the Blake's 7 audio drama The Syndeton Experiment.

Her other notable credits include Red Dwarf (as Deb Lister, a female counterpart of Dave Lister in a parallel universe), Prime Suspect and Only Fools and Horses in which she played Councillor Murray. She also appeared as prison officer Mandy Goodhue in the popular ITV1 prison drama series Bad Girls; this was the second time she had appeared in a British women's prison drama series, having played tough inmate Bobbie in an episode of Within These Walls titled "The Good Life".

Bruce played Gina in the 2002 film Mrs Caldicot's Cabbage War and in 2008 she guest-starred in the Sapphire & Steel audio dramas Second Sight and Zero. She also guest-starred in Old Wounds, a 2015 episode of Vera in which she played Beryl Doyle, mother of a murder victim found buried, having gone missing 30 years earlier. In June 2020, she appeared in an episode of the BBC soap opera Doctors as Carmen Few.

Filmography

References

External links
 
 Angela Bruce: Local Angel BBC Wear feature article

1951 births
Living people
English television actresses
Actresses from Leeds